The Singer of All Songs is the first novel in the Chanters of Tremaris trilogy by Kate Constable.

Plot summary 

Calwyn is a young priestess who chants the ice chants of Antaris.  She lives inside Antaris, a community located among mountains, which is enclosed by an ice wall.  The priestesses must maintain the wall with their chantments; that is, by singing certain songs, the knowledge of which is passed down to them through the temple. Nine powers can be achieved by such songs, though never by the same chanter. Legend has it that a Singer of All Songs will someday be born, who will know and use the songs of all the effects.

During one of the nine days of Strengthening, in which the priestesses sing to maintain the Wall, it is breached by a strange traveler, called Darrow.  Calwyn attempts to approach him; but when he sings in a low tone, Calwyn feels as though a hand is clutching her tunic and keeping her away. He is unable to maintain this and collapses because of an injury he had suffered, whereupon Calwyn brings Darrow back to the priestess' dwellings. The psychokinetic effect is revealed by the High Priestess to be of a chantment, the Power of Iron, which controls inanimate matter. Calwyn befriends Darrow, who now has a scar on his eyebrow and a permanent limp. Samis, a greedy sorcerer who wants to become the Singer of All Songs and rule the world of Tremaris, follows Darrow to Antaris.  Darrow and Calwyn manage to flee by jumping into the river that flows under the Wall.

They cross many miles to reach Kalysons, where Darrow meets his friends Tonno and Xanni to ask them for help.  All four sail on the boat Fledgewing to Mithates, where they seek the help of a chanter who can help them defeat Samis. In Mithates, the men leave to try finding remnants of the fire chantments, leaving Calwyn on the boat as women are not allowed in the war-machine-making colleges. Calwyn sees Samis' chantment-powered galley dock nearby and searches for her friends to warn them. She, on the way, meets Trout, a bespectacled, inventive college student, who has unknowingly acquired an ancient and powerful object; the Clarion of Flame. This Clarion, a trumpet-like device, is the last remnant of the Chantments of Fire.

Samis, using the chantments of Seeming (illusion) to give himself the appearance of Darrow, attempts to seduce Calwyn into giving him the Clarion; Calwyn, because of her soft spot for Darrow, is at first swayed, but eventually realizes the truth. Calwyn and Trout flee from Samis and the Mithate guards; Calwyn uses her chantments to aid their escape. They reach the boat, where they see the real Darrow, Tonno, and Xanni running towards them and away from Samis. Samis uses iron chantment to wield a dagger, threatening to kill Darrow; Xanni takes the blow and dies instead. Everyone, including Trout, escapes from Mithates.

The crew gives Xanni's dead body a burial at sea. Later, they all become embittered by his death. Their quest abandoned, the survivors are caught in a storm and are swept into the Great Sea.  There they are captured by pirates. Calwyn is taken aboard the pirates' ship because they believe that she is a windworker; a chanter able to control the wind. While aboard, Calwyn befriends the pirates' other windworker, Mica.

Mica soon teaches Calwyn how to sing a breeze, thus preventing the pirates from killing her out of hand. Calwyn's ability to sing chantments of both ice and wind convinces Mica that Calwyn's father, who remains unidentified, is an islander, on the grounds that only islanders can sing chantments of wind.

The pirates dock at Doryus Town, which is notorious for its slave trade and drug traffic. There, the pirate captain hopes to sell Calwyn to a man who desires a windworker, this man being an incognito Samis. When the pirates have been rendered into a stupor by the effects of a drug called slava, Calwyn, Mica, and the Fledgewings crew escape. At the same time, Samis tests the Clarion's power on the dormant volcano of the island of Doryus. The volcano erupts, revealing the Clarion's power to summon all forms of fire or heat. The crew of the Fledgewing travel to the arboreal Wildlands with new hope for their quest.

While approaching the Wildlands, the protagonists are confronted by the draconic Arakin, who are guardians of that region. Calwyn uses her powers of chantment to make peace with them, revealing that she has a third power of chantment in her composition; the Power of Beasts. This gives Darrow cause for contemplation and worry, in that it implies that Calwyn is the true Singer of All Songs.

In the forests of the Wildlands, the sailors are befriended by Halasaa, one of the mute, telepathic Tree People, who is the last guardian of the powers of Becoming; therefore, the power to heal, which is the only one of the Nine Chantments not dependent on audial speech. The Tree People send Halasaa away from their community of Spiridrell as punishment for befriending the outsiders, who have perpetrated genocide against them in the past. He escorts the outsiders, at their request, to the ancient, abandoned city of Spareth, where they meet Samis once more.

In the ancient, apparently high-tech city, they enter a tower, where Samis finds them again. In a final confrontation, Samis tricks and then terrorizes the crew of Fledgewing into singing the different chantments, claiming that he who commands the Nine Powers to be sung will become the Singer of all Songs. When Darrow's life is threatened, a despairing Calwyn sings the last chantment, a song of ice-call. Instead of transforming Samis into a god, the Great Power he has summoned absorbs and overwhelms him.

The crew are left to ponder how to realize Samis’ vision for a peaceful and united Tremaris without tyranny: not as one lone voice, as he wanted, but as many voices singing together.

 Characters Calwyn is a 16-year-old priestess of Antaris who can sing ice chantments. Tends to the bee hives and is skilled with medicines and herbs; apparently very skilled in singing chantments, for she is capable of calling ice, working wind, and placating animals with her songs. She yearns to travel beyond the ice wall of Antaris and does so when Darrow comes and takes her on a journey. Calwyn is adventurous, restless, and faithful to a fault; at times she may not see others' points of view and insists that she is right. Calwyn strives to prove her worth, and is upset when unable to do so. Calwyn takes after her mother, who too longed for whatever lay beyond the Wall. Is described as being tall and skinny with big black eyes and long black hair in one or two plaits down her back.    
  Darrow is a traveler who is trying to escape Samis (see next character), who is trying to kill him. Calwyn saves Darrow when he injures himself as he flies, by means of his own magic, over the Wall but fell to the ground from the top. When Calwyn helps him escape Antaris, she goes with him to stop Samis. An ironcrafter of Merithuros who was once friends with Samis but now aims to stop him. Calwyn calls him an old man whose life is almost over; he is mentally tired but enjoys traveling. He has traveled very far and Calwyn often asks him to tell her stories of his travels. Described as lean, light, hay compared, haired, hawk-eyed, having a crescent shaped scar over his right eye, and nearing his 30s. Has a limp from his fall over the Wall, but is later healed by Halasaa.   
  Samis an evil and greedy sorcerer who is trying to become The Singer of All Songs. In this position, he would be capable of manipulating wind, metal, wood, earth and ice, and communicating with animals not of his own race; as well as able to psychokinetically heal wounds, generate illusions, and produce fire. Was a minor prince of the Merithuran Empire who sought to be emperor, but was unable to earn him the title. Rejected, Samis instead sought to be ruler of all Tremaris. Wears a square iron ring jeweled with a ruby. Described as tall with a head too big for his frame; an ugly face looking like it was carved from stone; a beaked nose; a long mouth; and a mane of gray hair from a high brow.   
   Mica a 14- to 15-year-old windworker (a magician capable of controlling movement of wind). Works for pirates, but escapes with Calwyn on the boat Fledgewing. Her village was burned down by slavers, whereupon Mica was captured and sold to a pirate crew. Mica gives the impression of bravado so as to avoid seeming weak. Described as being skinny with tawny skin, pale hair, and golden eyes. Wears a faded jacket that once belonged to Mica's beloved grandmother.   
   Tonno the brother of Xanni. Darrow's friend. Unable to sing chantments himself. Prizes himself as the ship's cook. Described as tall and burly with bushy eyebrows, curly hair, dark eyes, and a sullen, serious look.   
   Xanni is the owner of Fledgewing and Tonno's younger brother, about one to two years younger than Darrow. A good natured, adventurous young man. He is mortally wounded in Mithates by Samis and later dies at sea. Described as short with curly hair, dark, bright eyes, and wrinkles formed from laughing on his face.   
   Trout a young inventor from Mithates who possesses, without knowledge of its use, the Clarion of the Flame. He joins Calwyn and her friends in Mithates. Trout wears glasses. He was involved in an explosion due to an invention of his that ruined his hearing; Trout is now unable to hear high-pitched sounds, and thus is unaffected by the chantments of illusion, which are highly pitched. Described as being freckled with vague, blue eyes, has numerous burn scars and scratches. Trout is initially skeptical of chantments, but is ultimately convinced of their reality. 
   Halasaa one of the telepathic, voiceless Tree People, and the last user of the power of Becoming, which is a healing power activated by certain gestures. Calwyn meets him in the Wildlands, after an encounter with the dragonlike arakin. Halasaa is rejected by his people for his gift, as well as for his acceptance of voiced people, but is still kind and hopeful. Because Calwyn is a magic-user, like himself, he calls her "sister". But the Tree People would still ask him to heal the ones that they couldn't. So they acknowledged his existence but didn't accept him. 
    Marna is the High Priestess of Antaris. Described as old with silver hair piled on her head and carrying a staff of her office. She is a tired and wise woman.   
   Tamen is the Guardian of the Wall. Stern and awe inspiring, Tamen seems to purposefully ridicule Calwyn. Marna says this is only because Calwyn may one day be High Priestess, meaning that Tamen and Calwyn would have to work together. Described as tall with a long black and silver braid down her back. She fears that Calwyn perhaps is even more powerful than her.Calida was Calwyn's mother. Restless like her daughter, she too sought to leave Antaris and explore the Outlands. Mysteriously, she vanished one day, only a little older than Calwyn. Many years later, Calida appeared during winter with baby Calwyn in her arms and died that night.   
   Ursca is the dumpy infirmarian of the priestess's dwellings. She tends to panic at every mistake, but when left to take care of a patient she is calm and in control. Ursca taught Calwyn everything she knows of herbs and medicines, but nearly drove Calwyn to madness with her fidgety ways and her tendency to, having acquired an opinion, hold onto it despite all evidence to the contrary.   
   Gilly is a novice ice priestess who is a friend to Calwyn. At the beginning of the book she begins her first Day of Strengthening. She is described as frivolous and prone to premature flirting with boys. She is only mentioned a couple times in the beginning.     
  Tuw' a gardener of the priestess's dwellings. He was born with a crooked foot and the other leg a hand span shorter than the other. Tuw has therefore fashioned a shoe with an exceptionally thick sole and many walking sticks, one which ends up in Darrow's possession.

Reception

The Kirkus reviews said "the actual workings of enchantment, definitions of the powers, various characters' emotions are well sketched," however, it added, the novel "lack[s] depth." It is "not meaty, but creative," the reviewer hedged. "Calwyn," Kirkus added, is "a fairly passive protagonist."

Publishers Weekly complained that "the sheer level of detail is overwhelming at first." The review adding, however, that "those who press on through the overwhelming detail will find their efforts rewarded." The review praised "Constable for imagining a rich satisfying universe."

References

External links

 http://www.kateconstable.com/synopsis1.html

2002 Australian novels
Australian fantasy novels